Barisia is a genus of lizards in the family Anguidae. The genus is endemic to Mexico.

Species
The following species are recognized as being valid.

Barisia ciliaris  – Sierra alligator lizard, imbricate alligator lizard
Barisia herrerae  – Herrera's alligator lizard 
Barisia imbricata  – imbricate alligator lizard, transvolcanic alligator lizard
Barisia jonesi  – imbricate alligator lizard 
Barisia levicollis  – Chihuahuan alligator lizard
Barisia planifrons  – Oaxaca alligator lizard
Barisia rudicollis  – rough-necked alligator lizard

Nota bene: A binomial authority in parentheses indicates that the species was originally described in a genus other than Barisia.

References

Further reading
Gray JE (1838). "Catalogue of the Slender-tongued Saurians, with Descriptions of many new Genera and Species". Ann. Mag. Nat. Hist., [First Series] 1: 274–283, 388–394. (Barisia, new genus, p. 390).

Barisia
Lizard genera
Taxa named by John Edward Gray